The IPSC Norwegian Handgun Championship is an IPSC level 3 championship held once a year by Dynamic Sports Shooting Norway.

Champions 
The following is a list of previous and current champions.

Overall category

Lady category

Junior category

Senior category

Super Senior category

See also 
Norwegian Rifle Championship
Norwegian Tournament Championship

References 
DSSN Hall of Fame
TriggerFreeze.com - IPSC Rifle Norway
IPSC :: Match Results - 2016 Norwegian Handgun Championship, Classic
IPSC :: Match Results - 2016 Norwegian Handgun Championship, Production
IPSC :: Match Results - 2016 Norwegian Handgun Championship, Standard
IPSC :: Match Results - 2016 Norwegian Handgun Championship, Open
Shoot'n Score It :: Match Results - 2016 Norwegian Handgun Championship, Revolver
Shoot'n Score It - Match Results - 2018 Norwegian Handgun Championship

IPSC shooting competitions
National championships in Norway
Norway sport-related lists
Shooting competitions in Norway
National shooting championships